William Thompson was Governor of the Bank of England from 1725 to 1727. He had been Deputy Governor from 1723 to 1725. He replaced Gilbert Heathcote as Governor and was succeeded by Humphry Morice.

See also
Chief Cashier of the Bank of England

References

External links

Governors of the Bank of England
Year of birth missing
Year of death missing
British bankers
Deputy Governors of the Bank of England